Shorts are a garment worn over the pelvic area and upper part of the legs.

Shorts may also refer to:  
Shorts (2009 film), a 2009 American film directed by Robert Rodriguez
Shorts (2013 film), a 2013 Bollywood film composed of five short films
Shorts (aerospace) or Short Brothers, a British aerospace company
The Shorts, a pop group from the Netherlands
The Shorts (ATC), an Australian Turf Club Thoroughbred horse race
Short film, motion pictures not long enough to be considered a feature film
Short circuit, a common electrical problem
Shorts Missile Systems or Thales Air Defence, a defence contractor
YouTube Shorts, a short-form video-sharing platform offered by YouTube

See also
"Short Shorts", a 1958 pop hit by The Royal Teens
Short (disambiguation)